Bearskin Lake Airport  is located  northwest of Bearskin Lake, Ontario, Canada.

Airlines and destinations

References

External links
 Page about this airport on COPA's Places to Fly airport directory
 

Certified airports in Kenora District